This is a list of British television-related events from 1983.

Events

January
1 January – Channel 4 airs One in Five, a late-night profile of homosexual lifestyles. This programme and The Eleventh Hour: Veronica 4 Rose, featuring two schoolgirls discussing lesbianism, lead to extreme criticism for the channel and an attempt by Conservative MP John Carlisle to have the channel banned.
3 January – Children's ITV launches as a new branding for the late afternoon programming block on ITV, replacing Watch It!.
6 January 
The network television premiere of Richard Donner's 1978 blockbuster Superman: The Movie on ITV, starring Christopher Reeve, Margot Kidder, Gene Hackman and Marlon Brando.
Debut of The Irish R.M. on Channel 4 in the UK and RTÉ1 in the Ireland.
14 January – TV-am broadcasts a special edition to advertisers shortly before the official launch on 1 February.
17 January – At 6:30am, Britain's first-ever breakfast television show, Breakfast Time, launches on BBC1.
 30 January – Channel 4 becomes the first broadcaster in the UK to show the Super Bowl live. 
January
BBC1 starts broadcasting a full afternoon service, consisting of regional programmes, repeats and old feature films.
London Weekend Television drops in-vision continuity.

February
1 February – TV-am launches on ITV at 6am, with Daybreak and Good Morning Britain.
4 February – The US sitcom Cheers, starring Ted Danson makes its UK debut on Channel 4. 
6 February – The Australian soap opera Sons and Daughters makes its UK debut when Central becomes the first ITV region to begin showing the programme. All other ITV regions soon follow suit.
8 February – Minipops makes its debut on Channel 4. Though a ratings success, it is axed after only one series due to heavy media criticism.
14 February – Granada faces an industrial dispute in which Coronation Street and World in Action are wiped out across the network.
17 February – Woodland Animations introduces a new stop-motion animated series, Gran, on BBC1, following the success of Postman Pat.
22 February – The US television series Knight Rider makes its debut on ITV with the feature length pilot episode, the following episode is shown two nights later,  however, scheduling of the show varies from other ITV regions, with STV not broadcasting the hit series until the 5th April.  
23 February – After months of "will she or won't she?" drama, Deirdre Barlow (Anne Kirkbride) makes the choice to break up with Mike Baldwin (Johnny Briggs) and reunite with her estranged husband Ken (William Roache) on Coronation Street. The episode was one of the highest-rated in the soap's history.
28 February 
TV-am cuts its Daybreak programme to 30 minutes, allowing Good Morning Britain to begin half an hour earlier. Original Daybreak presenters Robert Kee and Angela Rippon are both replaced, with Gavin Scot on weekdays and Lynda Barry on weekends.
BBC1 begins broadcasting a 30 minute Ceefax slot prior to the start of Breakfast Time. It is called Ceefax AM. It is first mentioned in the Radio Times on 21 March.

March
10 March – Debut of the cult comedy series Police Squad! on ITV, starring Leslie Nielsen.
18 March 
Amid falling ratings and mounting pressure from investors, Peter Jay steps aside as TV-am's Chief Executive allowing Jonathan Aitken to take on the role.
Channel 4 broadcasts in-vision teletext pages for the first time. Two magazines are shown, 4-Tel on View and Oracle on View and in fifteen minute bursts which are repeated several times each day prior to the start of each day's transmissions. Teletext pages are only shown on weekdays.
23 March – The BBC regrets that because of an industrial dispute at the printers in next week's edition of Radio Times are in short supply, but copies will be available in the South West, West, North East, parts of the South and North of England, but no S4C listings in the Wales edition.

April
1 April – Roland Rat makes his first appearance on TV-am. Created by David Claridge and launched by TV-am children's editor Anne Wood to entertain younger viewers during the Easter holidays, Roland is generally regarded as TV-am's saviour, being described as "the only rat to join a sinking ship".
2 and 9 April – Two issues of Radio Times fail to be published, due to industrial action.
5 April – Debut of First Tuesday on ITV, the subject matter was mainly social issues and current affairs stories from around the world, with programmes being shown on the first Tuesday of the month.
7 April – ITV airs an evening of programmes under the banner of ITV's Channel Four Showcase. It includes both current and upcoming Channel 4 programmes.
9 April – The US police action series T. J. Hooker makes its UK debut on ITV, starring William Shatner.
12 April – Timothy Aitken succeeds his cousin Jonathan as chief executive of TV-am, due to the IBA rules regarding MPs operating a television station.
15 April – BBC2 launches the long-running showbiz programme Entertainment USA, presented by Jonathan King. 
19 April – Angela Rippon and Anna Ford are axed from TV-am.
29 April – Michael Parkinson is appointed to TV-am's board of directors.
 April – No. 73 launches nationally as ITV's Saturday morning children's show. It had been launched the previous year as a regional programme by TVS.

May
1 May – Debut of Alfresco on ITV, starring Robbie Coltrane, Ben Elton, Stephen Fry, Hugh Laurie, Siobhan Redmond and Emma Thompson. It was named after the Italian word meaning "in the fresh air", unusual for a comedy sketch show of the time.
2 May – From that day, Ceefax pages are broadcast during all daytime downtime although BBC2 continues to fully close down for four hours after Play School. Teletext transmissions also begin on Channel 4 at around this time.
4 May – Jack Scott retires from the Met Office and presents his final national forecast for BBC Weather after 14 years and joining Thames News as its weatherman for five years.
5 May 
London-based listings magazine Time Out is not allowed to publish full day's television listings for BBC, ITV and Channel 4 programmes altogether, for some reasons that the Radio Times (BBC television/radio) and TVTimes (ITV/Channel 4) has brought the rights to publish other magazines such as newspapers, before the deregulation of television listings from 1 March 1991.
Top of the Pops celebrates its 1000th edition. The programme is also broadcast on BBC Radio 1 to allow viewers to listen to the programme in stereo. 
11 May – Peter Adamson makes his last appearance as Len Fairclough on Coronation Street.
17 May – Engineering Announcements is broadcast on ITV for the final time. 
23 May – TV-am's new look begins as Daybreak is axed, with Good Morning Britain extending to start at 6:25am. Commander David Philpott is moved to present the weather at the weekends only, with Wincey Willis becoming the new weekday weather presenter.
24 May – Engineering Announcements is shown on Channel 4 and S4C for the first time.

June
9–10 June – BBC1 and ITV broadcast coverage of the 1983 General Election. 
15 June – The first episode of The Black Adder starring Rowan Atkinson, the first in the successful Blackadder series of sitcoms, is broadcast on BBC1.  Also featuring Tony Robinson, Tim McInnerny and Brian Blessed.
24 June 
BBC Schools programmes under the title For Schools, Colleges are broadcast for the final time on BBC1 ahead of its move to BBC2 in the Autumn. 
Bob Monkhouse presents his last episode of Family Fortunes on ITV. 
25 June – The network television premiere of the 1979 Dracula film on ITV, starring Frank Langella.
27 June – The shareholders of Satellite Television agree a £5 million offer to give News International 65% of the company.

July
16 July – Debut of The Mad Death on BBC1, the three-part series examined the effects of an outbreak of rabies in the United Kingdom and was noted for its occasionally chilling content.
29 July – The hit US action-adventure series The A-Team makes its UK debut on ITV, starring Mr.T, George Peppard, Dirk Benedict and Dwight Schultz.

August
5 August – After 14 years on the air, the final edition of Nationwide is broadcast on BBC1. 
16 August – ITV broadcasts Woodentop as part of its Storyboard series. It would later be turned into a series and renamed The Bill, commencing on 16 October 1984 and lasting until 31 August 2010.
27–28 August – BBC2 Rocks Around the Clock by broadcasting non-stop music programmes all day and also all night.
29 August – The game show Blockbusters is launched on ITV, presented by Bob Holness and features sixth-form students as contestants.

September
5 September 
 Filmation's fantasy adventure cartoon series He-Man and the Masters of the Universe makes its world premiere on Children's ITV.
 ITV launches the espionage drama Reilly, Ace of Spies, starring Sam Neill.
 BBC1 screen part one of a four-part presentation of Mario Puzo's The Godfather.  Shown over consecutive nights, this is a specially re-edited version of both Godfather films, incorporating previously unseen material and presented in chronological order from 1901 to 1959.  Directed by Francis Ford Coppola and starring Marlon Brando, Al Pacino and Robert DeNiro.
6 September – ITV broadcasts Killer. It would later be turned into a series and renamed Taggart.
9 September – London Weekend Television launches a computerised version of its ident with the tagline "Your Weekend ITV".
12 September – The children's animated series Henry's Cat, created by veteran animators Stan Hayward and Bob Godfrey makes its debut on BBC1.
16 September – BBC2 closes down during the day for the final time, all future daytime downtime is filled by Pages from Ceefax.
19 September – Daytime on Two launches on BBC2. Broadcasting during term time from just after 9am until 3.00pm, the strand encompasses the BBC Schools programming previously shown on BBC1 and the BBC's adult educational programmes which are shown at lunchtime. A special version of its 'Computer Generated 2' is launched to introduce the programmes and a special sequence of Ceefax pages called the Daytime on Two information Service which is broadcast during the longer gaps between programmes.
 September – Central finally launches its East Midlands service. An industrial dispute had prevented them from launching it when it first went on air at the start of 1982.

October
2 October – ITV shows a live top flight football match for the first time since 1960. This marks the start of English football being shown on a national basis rather than on a regional basis, resulting in The Big Match becoming a fully national programme.
3 October – Bananaman makes its debut on BBC1, based on the Nutty comic strip with the voices of Tim Brooke-Taylor, Graeme Garden and Bill Oddie.
4 October 
Debut of the Welsh children's animated series SuperTed on BBC1 which was based on a series of stories written by Welsh writer, producer and animator Mike Young to help his son overcome his fear of the dark. The series became so popular it was spawned into merchandising and was broadcast in many countries worldwide.
The Adventures of Portland Bill, a stop-motion animated series from FilmFair London makes its debut on ITV.
9 October 
Gerry Anderson and Christopher Burr's science-fiction puppet series Terrahawks makes its debut on ITV, the show was Anderson's first in over a decade to use puppets for its characters and made use of latex Muppet-style hand puppets to animate the characters in a process Anderson dubbed "Supermacromation".
Channel 4 broadcasts Tony Harrison's The Oresteia, an adaptation of classical Greek myths.
12 October – Doris Speed makes her last appearance as Annie Walker on Coronation Street.
14 October – Max Bygraves becomes the new host of Family Fortunes on ITV. 
16 October – Satellite Television officially begins broadcasting in the UK. The channel had launched the previous year on cable in various European countries but to view the channel in the UK, a satellite dish approximately 10 feet (3 meters) wide had been required due to the channel being broadcast via the Orbital Test Satellite.
24 October – Sixty Minutes launches on BBC1, replacing Nationwide but ended less than a year later.
25 October – BBC1 starts airing the seventh season of the US drama series Dallas.
 October – Ceefax In Vision is seen through the morning and into the afternoon on BBC2 at the weekend for the first time during the Open University’s off-season. It continues to be shown on weekend mornings until the end of January when they reopen for the new term.

November
3 November – The network television premiere of Battlestar Galactica The Movie on ITV. Unbilled as such, this was the extended television version of the film, rather than the theatrical release version.
6 November – The final edition of Sale of the Century is broadcast on ITV after 12 years on the air. 
11 November – Dick Clement and Ian La Frenais hugely popular comedy-drama Auf Wiedersehen, Pet makes its debut on ITV.
17 November – Debut of the film Those Glory Glory Days on Channel 4, part of the First Love series.
18 November – The famous "turkey" episode of Family Fortunes is broadcast on ITV in which one contestant (Bob Johnson) while playing the Big Money round, offered the answer to the first three questions, it scored zero for the first two questions and 21 points for the third question. Earlier in the episode, both families struggled to name a famous Irishman. 
20 November – ITV begins showing the BAFTA and Golden Globe winning three part miniseries Kennedy, starring Martin Sheen as US President John F. Kennedy.
25 November – BBC1 airs a special feature-length episode of Doctor Who to celebrate the 20th anniversary of its first broadcast with The Five Doctors, featuring all the previous Doctors alongside Peter Davison's current Time Lord.  In the US, Chicago PBS station WTTW show the programme two days before the UK on the 23rd November.
29 November – BBC1 airs An Englishman Abroad, based on the true story of a chance meeting of actress Coral Browne, with Guy Burgess (Alan Bates), a member of the Cambridge spy ring who spied for the Soviet Union while an officer at MI6. The production was written by Alan Bennett and directed by John Schlesinger; Browne stars as herself. 
30 November – Debut of the Jim Davidson sitcom Up the Elephant and Round the Castle on ITV. 
November – An episode of ITV's animated series Danger Mouse has viewing figures reaching 21.59 million, an all-time high for a British children's programme.

December
3 December 
For the last time to date, Radio Times misses an issue but due to a print workers dispute.
The music video for Michael Jackson's Thriller, directed by John Landis, makes its debut on Channel 4 at 1:05am.
 5 December – Following the end of the Daytime on Two term, Ceefax is shown non-stop throughout the day on BBC2 for the first time with transmissions running continuously from around 9am until the start of programmes at 5:35pm.
10 December – ITV airs The Day After, about a fictional war between the NATO forces and the Warsaw Pact countries that rapidly escalates into a full-scale nuclear exchange between the United States and the Soviet Union which were due to start World War III.
21 December – The network television premiere of The Fog, John Carpenter's 1980 horror film on BBC1.
22 December – ITV shows the feature-length 1979 Filmation cartoon Flash Gordon: The Greatest Adventure of All.
24 December – The network television premiere of the cult 1980 Flash Gordon movie on BBC1, starring Sam J. Jones, Melody Anderson, Topol, Max von Sydow, Timothy Dalton and Brian Blessed.
25 December 
Channel 4 airs Skywhales, a animated short film by Derek Hayes and Phil Austin that depicts a fictional society of alien creatures dwelling in the atmosphere of a gas giant, noted for the completeness of its depiction of a fictitious society including social structures and practices.
Terry Wogan presents his final edition of Blankety Blank on BBC1. 
26 December – The network television premiere of John G. Avildsen's 1976 boxing drama film Rocky on BBC1, starring Sylvester Stallone, Talia Shire, Burt Young, Burgess Meredith and Carl Weathers.
27 December – The network television premiere of Oh, God! on BBC2, Carl Reiner's comedy about an unassuming supermarket manager chosen by God to spread his message and starring George Burns and John Denver.
29 December – Channel 4 broadcasts Raymond Briggs' animated television film The Snowman for the second time, with a new introduction by legendary pop superstar David Bowie.

Debuts

BBC1
5 January – Captain Zep – Space Detective (1983–1984)
12 January – Skorpion (1983)
16 January – Dombey and Son (1983)
17 January – Breakfast Time (1983–1989)
20 January 
 The Climber (1983)
 The Citadel (1983)
14 February – Little Miss (along with Mr. Men reruns) (BBC1 1983–1987, BBC2 1988)
17 February – Gran (1983)
23 February – The Machine Gunners (1983)
8 March – Baker Street Boys (1983)
23 March – To the Lighthouse (1983)
29 March – Tears Before Bedtime (1983)
7 April – Jury (1983)
13 May – Thief (1983)
3 June – Jack of Diamonds (1983)
5 June – The Hot Shoe Show (1983–1984)
15 June – Blackadder (1983–1989)
16 July – The Mad Death (1983)
3 September – Remington Steele (1982–1987)
12 September – Henry's Cat (1983–1993)
13 September – The Dark Side of the Sun (1983)
22 September 
 Give Us a Break (1983–1984)
 Just Good Friends (1983–1986)
 Breadwinners (1983–1986)
3 October – Bananaman (1983–1986)
4 October – SuperTed (1983–1986)
5 October – Seaview (1983–1985)
9 October – Jane Eyre (1983)
16 October 
By the Sword Divided (1983–1985)
Sweet Sixteen (1983)
24 October – Sixty Minutes (1983–1984)
25 October – Don't Wait Up (1983–1990)
7 November – So You Want to be Top? (1983–1985)
9 November –  Spyship (1983)
10 November – Johnny Jarvis (1983)
16 November – The Winner (1983)
29 November – An Englishman Abroad (1983)
13 December 
 The Aerodrome (1983)
 No Place Like Home (1983–1987)
26 December – The Tale of Beatrix Potter (1982)
30 December –  Waters of the Moon (1983)

BBC2
10 January – Making the Most of the Micro (1983)
11 January - Look and Read: Fairground (1983)
19 January – The Cleopatras (1983)
7 March – My Cousin Rachel (1983)
10 March – Tucker's Luck (1983–1985)
15 March – Dear Ladies (1983–1985)
13 April – Shackleton (1983)
15 May – Entertainment USA (1983-1989)
18 May – Pinkerton's Progress (1983)
7 July – The Crystal Cube (1983)
3 August – Grey Granite (1983)
7 September – The Gathering Seed (1983)
15 September – The Old Men at the Zoo (1983)
2 October – Micro Live (1983–1987)
24 October – The Bob Monkhouse Show (1983–1986)
28 October – Good Behaviour (1983)
29 October – The Beggar's Opera (1983)
6 November – Mansfield Park (1983)
16 December – Heartattack Hotel (1983)
19 December – A Talent for Murder (1983)

ITV
3 January – Children's ITV (Afternoon block 1983–2007, Morning block 1983–present)
4 January – Bloomfield (1983)
5 January – Unknown Chaplin (1983)
6 January – The Coral Island (1983)
9 January – The Forgotten Story (1983)
10 January 
 Alphabet Zoo (1983–1984)
 Mike Yarwood in Persons (1983–1984)
16 January – Live from Her Majesty's (1983–1988)
22 January – Luna (1983–1984)
24 January – The Moomins (1983–1985)
25 January – The Hard Word (1983)
1 February 
Daybreak (1983)
Good Morning Britain (1983–1992)
2 February – The Home Front (1983)
6 February – Sons and Daughters (1982–1987)
11 February – Pictures (1983)
13 February – Number 10 (1983)
17 February - Knight Rider (1982–1986)
20 February – The Boy Who Won the Pools (1983)
21 February – Brass (1983–1990)
10 March – Police Squad! (1982)
13 March – Cuffy (1983)
16 March – Widows (1983–1985)
22 March – Studio (1983)
5 April – First Tuesday (1983–1993)
8 April 
Death of an Expert Witness (1983)
Make Me Laugh (1983)
9 April – T. J. Hooker (1982-1986)
12 April – Goodnight and God Bless (1983)
16 April – Philip Marlowe, Private Eye (1983–1986)
18 April – Spooky (1983)
29 April – Hallelujah! (1983–1984)
1 May – Alfresco (1983–1984)
9 May – Jamaica Inn (1983)
17 May – No Excuses (1983)
27 May – Shades of Darkness (1983)
8 June – Jemima Shore Investigates (1983)
19 June – Birth of a Nation (1983)
20 June – The Happy Apple (1983)
26 June – Flying into the Wind (1983)
3 July – Rhino (1983)
5 July – Moschops (1983)
10 July 
Made in Britain (1983)
A Married Man (1983)
24 July – Now and Then (1983–1984)
25 July – Miracles Take Longer  (1983–1984)
26 July – Storyboard  (1983–1989)
29 July – The Cabbage Patch (1983)
29 July – The A-Team (1983–1987)
14 August – The Balance of Nature (1983)
23 August – Affairs of the Heart (1983–1985)
29 August – Blockbusters (1983–93, 1994–95, 1997, 2000–01, 2012, 2019)
31 August – Charlie Muffin (1979)
5 September 
He-Man and the Masters of the Universe (1983–1985)
Reilly, Ace of Spies (1983)
6 September – Taggart (1983–2011)
9 September – A Brother's Tale (1983)
12 September – Dramarama (1983–1989)
14 September – The All Electric Amusement Arcade (1983)
30 September – The Outsider (1983)
3 October 
Orm and Cheep (1983–1985)
Terrahawks (1983–1986)
4 October – The Adventures of Portland Bill (1983–1986)
9 October –   The Secret Adversary (1983)
16 October – Agatha Christie's Partners in Crime (1983–1984)
23 October – Highway (1983–1993)
11 November – Auf Wiedersehen, Pet (1983–1986, 2002–2004)
14 November – The Witches and the Grinnygog (1983)
20 November – Kennedy (1983)
23 November – Chessgame (1983)
27 November – Struggle (1983–1986)
29 November –  Saigon: Year of the Cat (1983)
30 November – Up the Elephant and Round the Castle (1983–1985)
10 December – The Day After (1983)
27 December – The Wind in the Willows  (1983–1987; 1990)

Channel 4
6 January – The Irish R.M. (1983–1985)
7 January – No Problem! (1983–1985)
8 January – The Lady Is a Tramp (1983–1984)
9 January - Story of the Alps: My Annette (1983)
4 February – Cheers (1982–1993)
8 February – Minipops (1983)
17 April – Father's Day (1983–1984)
18 April – St. Elsewhere (1982–1988)
16 June – Red Monarch (1983)
2 July – Nana (1981)
7 August – One Summer (1983)
6 October – The Nation's Health (1983)
4 November – Who Dares Wins (1983–1988)
17 November –  Those Glory Glory Days (1983)
24 November – The Country Girls (1983)
25 December – Skywhales (1983)

Television shows

Changes of network affiliation

Continuing television shows

1920s
BBC Wimbledon (1927–1939, 1946–2019, 2021–present)

1930s
The Boat Race (1938–1939, 1946–2019)
BBC Cricket (1939, 1946–1999, 2020–2024)

1940s
Come Dancing (1949–1998)

1950s
Panorama (1953–present)
Crackerjack (1955–1984, 2020–present)
What the Papers Say (1956–2008)
The Sky at Night (1957–present)
Blue Peter (1958–present)
Grandstand (1958–2007)

1960s
Coronation Street (1960–present)
Songs of Praise (1961–present)
Doctor Who (1963–1989, 1996, 2005–present)
World in Action (1963–1998)
Top of the Pops (1964–2006)
Match of the Day (1964–present)
Crossroads (1964–1988, 2001–2003)
Play School (1964–1988)
Mr. and Mrs. (1965–1999)
World of Sport (1965–1985)
Jackanory (1965–1996, 2006)
Sportsnight (1965–1997)
Call My Bluff (1965–2005)
The Money Programme (1966–2010)
The Big Match (1968–2002)
Screen Test (1969–1984)

1970s
The Old Grey Whistle Test (1971–1987)
The Two Ronnies (1971–1987, 1991, 1996, 2005)
Crown Court (1972–1984)
Are You Being Served? (1972–1985)
Pebble Mill at One (1972–1986)
Weekend World (1972–1988)
Rainbow (1972–1992, 1994–1997)
Emmerdale (1972–present)
Newsround (1972–present)
We Are the Champions (1973–1987)
Last of the Summer Wine (1973–2010)
That's Life! (1973–1994)
Wish You Were Here...? (1974–2003)
Arena (1975–present)
Jim'll Fix It (1975–1994)
Rentaghost (1976–1984)
One Man and His Dog (1976–present)
The Krypton Factor (1977–1995)
3-2-1 (1978–1988)
Grange Hill (1978–2008)
Ski Sunday (1978–present)
Terry and June (1979–1987)
The Book Tower (1979–1989)
Blankety Blank (1979–1990, 1997–2002)
The Paul Daniels Magic Show (1979–1994)
Antiques Roadshow (1979–present)
Question Time (1979–present)

1980s
The Gentle Touch (1980–1984)
Juliet Bravo (1980–1985)
Cockleshell Bay (1980–1986)
Play Your Cards Right (1980–1987, 1994–1999, 2002–2003) 
Family Fortunes (1980–2002, 2006–2015, 2020–present) 
Children in Need (1980–present)
A Fine Romance (1981–1984)
Punchlines (1981–1984)
Finders Keepers (1981–1985)
Freetime (1981–1985)
Game for a Laugh (1981–1985)
Tenko (1981–1985)
That's My Boy (1981–1986)
Razzamatazz (1981–1987)
Bergerac (1981–1991)
The Saturday Show (1982–1984)
The Young Ones (1982–1984)
Odd One Out (1982–1985)
On Safari (1982–1985)
Only Fools and Horses (1981–2003)
'Allo 'Allo! (1982–1992)
Wogan (1982–1992)
Saturday Superstore (1982–1987)
The Tube (1982–1987)
Brookside (1982–2003)
Let's Pretend (1982–1988)
No. 73 (1982–1988)
Timewatch (1982–present)
Countdown (1982–present)
Right to Reply (1982–2001)

Ending this year
 6 February – The Professionals (1977–1983)
 8 March – Animal Magic (1962–1983)
 15 March – Minipops (1983)
 21 April – ITV Playhouse (1967–1983)
 12 May – Gran (1983)
 5 July – The Gaffer (1981–1983)
 21 July – Andy Robson (1982–1983)
 5 August – Nationwide (1969–1983)
 19 October – Butterflies (1978–1983, 2000)
 28 October – The Bounder (1982–1983)
 30 December – The Good Old Days (1953–1983)Story of the Alps: My Annette (1983)

Births
 31 January – James Sutton, actor (Hollyoaks)
 5 February – Gemma McCluskie, actress (d. 2012), 
 14 March – Johnny Flynn, actor
 15 March – Sean Biggerstaff, actor
 21 March – Bruno Langley, actor
 23 March – Ellie Price, television journalist
 22 April – Elliott Jordan, actor
 5 May – Lucy-Jo Hudson, actress
 13 May – Natalie Cassidy, actress
 30 May – Jennifer Ellison, actress
 31 May – Reggie Yates, actor and television and radio presenter
 6 June
Gemma Bissix, actress
Ella Smith, actress
 30 June – Cheryl Cole, singer
 19 July – Brooke Kinsella, actress and writer
 20 July – Rory Jennings, actor
 5 August – Kara Tointon, actress
 7 August – Tina O'Brien, actress
 21 August – Chantelle Houghton, reality TV star
 24 August – Christopher Parker, actor
 28 October – Joe Thomas, actor
 17 November – Harry Lloyd, actor

Deaths

See also
 1983 in British music
 1983 in British radio
 1983 in the United Kingdom
 List of British films of 1983

References